Philip Jerome Prygoski (December 7, 1947 – October 5, 2019) was a professor of Constitutional law at Western Michigan University Cooley Law School. He earned a Bachelor of Arts degree at the University of Michigan in 1969. He then earned a juris doctor degree at the University of Michigan in 1973. He also held a Master of Arts degree from the University of Michigan, conferred in 1978, and a master of laws degree from the University of Michigan, conferred in 1983.

Professor Prygoski authored Sum and Substance: Constitutional Law, a treatise on U.S. Constitutional law. He was a member of the American Law Institute (ALI).

On October 5, 2019, Phillip J. Prygoski died.

Prygoski, Philip J., Sum and Substance: Constitutional Law 4th ed., Minneapolis, Minn.: West Pub. Co. (1998).
Prygoski, Philip J., Sum and Substance: Constitutional Law 3rd ed., Minneapolis, Minn.: West Pub. Co. (1997).
Prygoski, Philip J., Sum and Substance: Constitutional Law 1st and 2nd eds., Minneapolis, Minn.: West Pub. Co. (1996).

Articles

Prygoski, Philip J. "War As the Prevailing Metaphor in Federal Indian Law Jurisprudence: An Exercise in Judicial Activism" 14 T M Cooley Law Review 491 (1997).
Prygoski, Philip J., "The Implications of Davis v. Davis for Reproductive Rights Analysis," 61 Tennessee Law Review 609 (1994).
Prygoski, Philip J., "Abortion and the Right to Die: Judicial Imposition of a Theory of Life," 23 Seton Hall Law Review 67 (1992).
Prygoski, Philip J., "Will v. Michigan Department of State Police: The Eleventh Amendment in State Courts," 43 Oklahoma Law Review 429 (1990).
Prygoski, Philip J., "The Supreme Court's 'Secondary Effects' Analysis in Free Speech Cases," 6 Cooley Law Review 1 (1988).
Prygoski, Philip J., "Low-Value Speech from Young to Fraser," 32 St. Louis University Law Journal 317 (1987).
Prygoski, Philip J., "Justice Sanford and Modern Free Speech Analysis: Back to the Future," 75 Kentucky Law Journal J 45 (1986).
Prygoski, Philip J., "Of Predispositions and Dispositions: An Attitudinal Study of Decisionmaking in Child Abuse and Neglect Cases," 21 Houston Law Review 883 (1984).
Prygoski, Philip J., "When a Hearing is not a Hearing: Irrebuttable Presumption and Termination of Parental Rights Based on Status," 44 University of Pittsburgh Law Review 879 (1983).
Prygoski, Philip J., "Due Process and Designated Members of Administrative Tribunals," 33 Administrative Law Review 441 (1981).
Prygoski, Philip J., "Supreme Court Review of Congressional Action in the Federalism Area," 18 Duquesne Law Review 197 (1980).

Other writings

Prygoski, Philip J., "The Rights of a Pregnant Woman:  Conflicts in the Law?"  Compleat Lawyer (Fall 1998).
Prygoski, Philip J., "The Supreme Court's Treatment of Tribal Sovereignty From Marshall to Marshall," Compleat Lawyer (Fall 1995).

References

External links
Cooley page for Philip J. Prygoski

2019 deaths
American legal scholars
Western Michigan University Cooley Law School faculty
Place of birth missing
University of Michigan Law School alumni
1947 births
American people of Polish descent